Affonso Eduardo Reidy (Paris, 26 October 1909 - Rio de Janeiro, 10 August 1964) was a Brazilian architect. He was the son of an English father and a Brazilian mother. Reidy entered the Escola Nacional de Belas Artes in Rio de Janeiro at age 17. He apprenticed with the French urban planner Alfred Agache (1875-1959) during his studies. Reidy graduated and became an architect in 1930. Lúcio Costa appointed him as a teaching assistant to the architect Gregori Warchavchik (1896-1972) at the Escola Nacional de Belas Artes in the same year.

Projects

Projects by Affonso Reidy include:
Pedregulho Housing Complex — Benfica neighborhood of Rio de Janeiro.
Museum of Modern Art, Rio de Janeiro — landscape design by Roberto Burle Marx.
Carmen Miranda Museum - located in the Parque Brigadeiro Eduardo Gomes (Flamengo Park)
Ministry of Education and Health Building (Gustavo Capanema Palace, Rio de Janeiro) — with Lucio Costa, Oscar Niemeyer, Jorge Moreira, Ernani Vasconcelos. and Carlos Leao.

See also
Brazilian architects
Modernist architecture in Brazil

References

Brazilian architects
Modernist architects
20th-century Brazilian architects
1909 births
1964 deaths
French emigrants to Brazil